The Canes II Group or Canes Venatici II Group (CVn II Group) is a group of galaxies about 26.1 million light-years away from Earth. The group resides in the Local Supercluster. The largest galaxy within the cluster is M106 (NGC 4258), which is a barred spiral galaxy.

Galaxies in the Cluster
Canes II is directly behind Canes I, which makes it difficult to show which galaxy belongs in which cluster. It is generally accepted that the following galaxies belong in Canes II;

References

See also
 Canes I Group (CVn I GrG)
 Canes Venatici Cloud 

 
Galaxy clusters
Virgo Supercluster
Canes Venatici

\